The 2013 Women's Four Nations Hockey Tournament was the second of two women's field hockey tournaments, consisting of a series of test matches. It was held in Hamilton and Tauranga, New Zealand, from April 17 to 21, 2013, and featured four of the top nations in women's field hockey.

Competition format
The tournament featured the national teams of Argentina, South Korea, the United States, and the hosts, New Zealand, competing in a round-robin format, with each team playing each other once. Three points were awarded for a win, one for a draw, and none for a loss.

Officials
The following umpires were appointed by the International Hockey Federation to officiate the tournament:

 Karen Bennett (NZL)
 Amber Church (NZL)
 Irene Clelland (AUS)
 Suzi Sutton (USA)
 Veronica Villafañe (ARG)
 Kim Yoon-Seon (KOR)

Results
All times are local (New Zealand Standard Time).

Preliminary round

Fixtures

Classification round

Third and fourth place

Final

Statistics

Final standings

Goalscorers

References

External links
Official website

2013 in women's field hockey
field hockey